Eugene Thomas "Gene" Waldorf (February 25, 1936 – February 29, 2020) was an American electrical engineer and politician.

Waldorf was born in St. Cloud, Minnesota. He graduated from Cathedral High School in St. Cloud. Waldorf served in the United States Army. Waldorf received his bachelor's degree from University of Minnesota. He lived with his wife and family in Saint Paul, Minnesota  and worked as an electrical engineer for the 3M Company. Waldorf served in the Minnesota House of Representatives from 1977 to 1980 and in the Minnesota Senate from 1981 to 1993. He was a Democrat. In 2010, Waldorf ran as an Independent for the United States House of Representatives.

Notes

1936 births
2020 deaths
Politicians from St. Cloud, Minnesota
Politicians from Saint Paul, Minnesota
Military personnel from Minnesota
University of Minnesota alumni
American electrical engineers
Minnesota Democrats
Minnesota Independents
Minnesota state senators
Members of the Minnesota House of Representatives